Mansfield Town Football Club is a professional football club based in the town of Mansfield, Nottinghamshire, England. Nicknamed 'The Stags', they play in a blue and yellow kit. Since 1919, Mansfield have played at Field Mill, which is now an all-seater stadium with a capacity of 9,186. Their main rivals are Chesterfield and Notts County.

The club was formed in 1897 as Mansfield Wesleyans and entered the Mansfield & District Amateur League in 1902, before changing its name to Mansfield Wesley and joining the Notts & District League in 1906. They then finally became Mansfield Town in 1910, and moved from the Notts & Derbyshire League to the Central Alliance the following year. Crowned Alliance champions in 1919–20, they joined the Midland League in 1921 and would win this league on three occasions – 1923–24, 1924–25 and 1928–29 – before they were admitted into the Football League in 1931. They were relegated out of the Third Division in 1960, but won promotion out of the Fourth Division in 1962–63, remaining in the third tier for nine seasons until their relegation in 1972. They reached the Second Division for the first time after winning the Fourth Division title in 1974–75 and the Third Division title in 1976–77, only to suffer two relegations in three seasons.

Promoted out of the Fourth Division under the stewardship of Ian Greaves in 1985–86, they went on to win the Football League Trophy in 1986–87. Mansfield were however relegated in 1991 and promoted again in 1991–92, only to suffer an immediate relegation the following season. They won promotion once again in 2001–02, but were relegated to League Two in 2003 and lost their Football League status with a further relegation in 2008. They spent five seasons in the Conference until they were promoted back into the Football League after winning the Conference in 2012–13 following investment from new club owner John Radford.

History

Early years

Mansfield Town was formed under the name of Mansfield Wesleyans in 1897, the name of the club coming from the local Wesleyan church. The club played friendlies up until the 1902–03 season, when it joined the Mansfield and District Amateur League. When the league dropped its amateur tag in 1906, the church abandoned the club, which changed its name to Mansfield Wesley and moved into the Notts and District League.

In the summer of 1910, despite having lost the previous season to Mansfield Mechanics in the Second Qualifying Round of the FA Cup, the team changed its name to Mansfield Town (much to the disgust of the Mechanics). In the following years, Mansfield Town swapped between the Notts and District League, Central Alliance League and Notts and Derbyshire League, before World War I brought a halt to proceedings.

After the war, Mansfield became occupants of the Field Mill ground, after Mansfield Mechanics failed to pay their rent. In 1921, the club was admitted into the Midland Counties League, and celebrated by reaching the sixth qualifying round of the FA Cup twice in a row. The club won the league in 1923–24 and was the runner-up the following season, but on both occasions failed to win election to the Football League.

In 1928–29, Mansfield won the Midland League again, but more famously reached the fourth round proper of the FA Cup, losing 2–0 to First Division club Arsenal, after a cup run which saw them beat Second Division side Wolverhampton Wanderers. However, York City beat the Stags in elections for a League place.

Into the Football League
In 1931, Mansfield were finally elected to the Southern Section of the Third Division. However, the club struggled to adapt to League surroundings and were frequently in the lower reaches of the table. One of very few highlights in the years before the Second World War was Ted Harston, who scored 55 goals in one season before transferring to Liverpool.

After the war, Mansfield started to see some progress. Lucky to escape the need for re-election when it was decided that no club would be relegated after the 1946–47 season, the Stags started to move up the table. In 1950–51, Mansfield reached the fifth round of the FA Cup and became the first Football League team to complete a 23–game home schedule unbeaten, although missed out on the only Third Division promotion spot.

In 1959–60 the club was relegated to the recently created Fourth Division, before gaining promotion back to the Third Division in 1962–63. This promotion was later tainted by life-time suspensions handed out to players Brian Phillips and Sammy Chapman for bribing opponents, including players of Hartlepools United in a vital match which Mansfield won 4–3. Two seasons later, the club again narrowly missed out on promotion to the Second Division. The season after avoiding relegation due to a points deduction for Peterborough United, Mansfield made another headline-grabbing cup run. Mansfield beat First Division West Ham United 3–0 in the fifth round of the 1968–69 FA Cup, before narrowly losing to Leicester City in the quarter finals. In 1971–72 Mansfield were relegated, again, to the Fourth Division.

By 1976–77, the club was back in the Third Division, and despite the distraction of a 5–2 FA Cup defeat to Matlock Town, beat Wrexham to the Third Division title. The club went straight back down, and only a good run of form at the end of the 1978–79 season saved Mansfield from a double relegation.

Mansfield won the Football League Trophy in front of 58,000 fans in May 1987, beating Bristol City on penalties after a 1–1 draw. However, the years that followed were inconsistent, with Mansfield becoming a "yo-yo" team between the Third and Fourth Divisions. Also at that time, the controversial Keith Haslam bought the club.

21st century
In 2001–02, Mansfield were again promoted to the third tier of English football, beating Carlisle United on the final day of the season to take third place from Cheltenham Town, who lost at Plymouth Argyle. A poor season in Division Two did not pick up even with the arrival of former England international Keith Curle as manager, as the club was relegated straight back to the fourth tier of English football. In 2003–04, Mansfield beat Northampton Town in a penalty shoot-out in the Division Three play-off semi-finals, but lost to Huddersfield Town in a similar fashion final, after having an apparently legitimate Colin Larkin goal disallowed.

In 2007–08, Mansfield's 77-year stay in the Football League came to an end as the club was relegated to the Conference. This was in spite of an excellent FA Cup run, leading to two BBC TV appearances, against Harrogate Railway Athletic and Middlesbrough. A fluke goal in a 1–0 loss to rivals Rotherham United in the last home game of the season all but guaranteed relegation. Ugly scenes erupted at the final whistle, with controversial owner Keith Haslam being attacked by fans.

Haslam left the club, as the "Three Amigos" of Perry, Middleton and Saunders purchased the club (but not the ground) for £1 and installed Billy McEwan as manager. He was replaced after Christmas by David Holdsworth. Holdsworth's two-and-a-half year reign bought little improvement to the club and he was dismissed as manager.

Caretaker manager Duncan Russell led Mansfield to an FA Trophy final appearance in 2010–11, Louis Briscoe scoring a late extra-time winner against Luton in the semi-final second leg. The Stags lost 1–0 to Darlington at Wembley Stadium after a 120th-minute extra-time goal by Chris Senior. A league position of 12th was not good enough for Russell to keep his job; Paul Hall replaced him as interim manager during the close season.

His replacement, Paul Cox, led Mansfield to their highest Conference finish in his first season. A good run of form after Christmas saw the Stags finish in third in the league, although they lost 2–1 on aggregate to eventual play-off winners York City after extra time in the promotion play-off semi-final.

An indifferent start to the 2012–13 season left Mansfield lingering around mid-table, with some fans calling for the manager's head. One good point to the first half of the season was the club's FA Cup run. A 2–1 win over Lincoln City set up a third round tie with Premier League side Liverpool. A controversial Luis Suárez goal helped the Reds to a 2–1 victory, but a brave display from the Mansfield team gave the team momentum in the weeks to follow. Following the cup game the Stags won 20 of their last 24 games, including a club record run of 12 consecutive wins, to clinch the Conference Premier title, and promotion back to the Football League. The title was sealed with a 1–0 victory over Wrexham on 20 April 2013.

After a poor start to the 2020–21 season, Nigel Clough took over as manager in November and steered Mansfield to relative safety. 12 games without a win early in the 2021–22 season saw Mansfield second bottom of League Two in late October, but after a subsequent 14-match unbeaten streak from late November to early March, including a club-record 11 straight home wins, the Stags finished 7th in League Two, just 3 points shy of automatic promotion. They beat Northampton Town 3–1 on aggregate in the playoff semi-finals. However, in the final Port Vale secured an emphatic 3–0 win.

Ownership
The 2006–07 season saw the creation of the "SFFC (Stags Fans for Change)" an organisation aiming for the removal of then owner Keith Haslam from the club. The organisation undertook many projects over the year to get their message over in a different and non-aggressive way. This included hiring a plane to fly over the local derby match with Notts County towing a banner declaring that the club was for sale and calling for Haslam to leave. On 29 November 2007 Haslam rejected a bid from James Derry's consortium and the Mansfield fans pledged to have a TV protest against him on 2 December 2007 against Harrogate Railway Athletic live on the BBC's Match of the Day programme.

In March 2008, it was reported that John Batchelor, a bidder for Mansfield Town, planned to rename the club to Harchester United after the fictional squad from the TV series Dream Team to make the club "more promotable" if his bid were a success. Fans and executives within the club both stated that they would oppose the name change.

Following the club's relegation in 2008, Colin Hancock, then the chairman of Glapwell, emerged as the leading bidder as he agreed to purchase a controlling share of the Stags, Field Mill, and some land surrounding the stadium from Haslam. However, three businessmen who are also Mansfield Town fans, Andrew Perry, Andrew Saunders and Steve Middleton, bought the club from Keith Haslam for an undisclosed fee, but they were still renting the stadium from him. At the start of the 2010–11 season Mansfield were bought by John Radford.

On 2 December 2010 the club was locked out of Field Mill in a dispute over unpaid rent. Since returning to Field Mill after securing a lease on the ground for a further year and a half, John Radford began to seek a way by which the club would once again own Field Mill. It was reported that Keith Haslam rejected an offer from Radford for Field Mill; the offer was alleged to have been worth in between £2 million and £4 million.

On 1 March 2012, Chairman John Radford purchased the ground from Keith Haslam. Since then, 1 March is considered "Amber Day" at the club to commemorate the retrieval of Mansfield's stadium. In April 2012, Radford changed the stadium's name from "Field Mill" to the "One Call Stadium" for sponsorship reasons.

Club culture

Rivalries
The 2003 Football Fans Census indicates that Mansfield's biggest rivalries are with Chesterfield and Notts County, with Doncaster Rovers tertiary rivals. Bad blood between Chesterfield and Mansfield has links to the miners' strike. Fixtures between Town and County are referred to as Nottinghamshire derbies. More recently, a lesser rivalry has grown with Grimsby Town.

Club colours
During the Wesleyans era, Mansfield played in chocolate and sky blue shirts, firstly striped until 1902, and then halved. Upon assuming the Mansfield Town moniker, the club switched to red shirts, white shorts, and black socks, though this identity only lasted the 1910–11 season. A five-year stint in black and white quartered shirts with black shorts and socks followed before the club closed down.

Upon their return in 1919, Town introduced their now-familiar blue and amber club colour scheme, initially in halves. Becoming a league side in 1931 coincided with a change to pale blue shirts with white shorts, which the club would wear until October 1934, when the blue and amber returned (albeit in quarters for the remainder of the 1934–35 season). They would continue to wear this colour combination in various arrangements (including a blue shirt with amber sleeves from January 1948) for two decades. From 1954 to 1961 Town played in white shirts and black shorts, before amber shirts with blue shorts returned for seven years. All-blue with amber trim was selected in 1968, before a new look of white shirts with blue shorts was introduced in 1970.

1974 saw the classic colour scheme return, and though the composition might vary, amber and blue has reigned ever since. The only exception to this was the centenary kit worn in the 1997–98 season, which was a retro kit design styled after Mansfield Wesleyans' first, albeit with sky blue shorts and socks.

Kit suppliers and shirt sponsors
The following tables detail the shirt sponsors and kit suppliers of Mansfield by year:

Players

Current squad

Former players
For details of former players, see List of Mansfield Town F.C. players

Club officials

Boardroom

Owner/Chairman – John Radford and Carolyn Radford
Chief executive officer – David Sharpe
Financial director – James Beachill
Director - Alex Sherriff
Director – Steve Hymas
Director – Mark Burton
Director - Paul Brown
Club secretary / Supporters' liaison officer  – Diane Ceney

First team staff

Manager – Nigel Clough
Assistant manager – Gary Crosby
First team coach - Andy Garner
Physio – Tom Whittamore
Goalkeeper coach - Adam Collin
Head of recruitment - Simon Clough

Managerial history

Honours and achievements
Football League Third Division (3rd tier)
Champions: 1976–77

Football League Fourth Division (4th tier)
Champions: 1974–75
3rd place promotion: 1985–86, 1991–92, 2001–02
4th place promotion: 1962–63

Conference Premier (5th tier)
Champions: 2012–13

Midland League
Champions: 1923–24, 1924–25, 1928–29

Central Alliance
Champions: 1919–20

Football League Trophy
Winners: 1986–87

FA Trophy
Runners-up: 2010–11

Club records

 Team records

 Record win
 9–2 v. Rotherham United, 27 December 1932 (home) (two 7-goal victories since)
 Record defeat
 1–8 v. Walsall, 19 January 1933 (Away)

 Best seasons
 Most wins
 28 – 1974–75, 1976–77 (overall)
 30 – 2012–13
 Fewest defeats
 6 – 1974–75 (overall)
 7 – 2011–12
 Most goals for
 108 – 1962–63
 Fewest goals against
 38 – 1984–85
 Most points
 68 – 1974–75 (2 points per win)
 95 – 2012–13 (3 points per win)

Player records
Records for all recognized league and cup competitions

 Most appearances
 Rod Arnold (1970–71, 72–84) 522 games
 Most goals
 Harry Johnson (1931–36) 114 goals

References

External links

 Mansfield Town official website
 Independent Supporters Website
 Official website of the Stags Supporters Association

 
1897 establishments in England
Association football clubs established in 1897
Football clubs in England
Sport in Mansfield
Midland Football League (1889)
English Football League clubs
National League (English football) clubs
EFL Trophy winners
Central Alliance